András Batiz (born 31 May 1975) is a Hungarian anchorman who served as spokesman of the Hungarian government from 6 October 2004 to 1 August 2006.

He worked for the Magyar Televízió, then for the RTL Klub. He was the anchorman of the Focus, which is a daily report magazine, between 1997 and 2004. Batiz is married and has two children: Iván (b. 2006) and Léda (b. 2010).
Since 2007 he is the owner and MD of Impact Works Ltd. where he leads communication trainings for managers primarily in Hungary and the neighboring countries.

References
 Batiz Consulting
 Sulinet.hu
 Sztárlexikon
 

1975 births
Living people
Hungarian journalists
Government spokespersons of Hungary